Lans-en-Vercors is a commune in the Isère department in southeastern France.

Population

Twin towns
Lans-en-Vercors is twinned with:

  Saint-Donat, Lanaudière, Quebec, Canada, since 1990

See also
Communes of the Isère department
Parc naturel régional du Vercors

References

External links

Official site

Communes of Isère
Isère communes articles needing translation from French Wikipedia